Shadmehr aghili (born 27 January 1973) is an Iranian pop singer, musician, composer, music arranger, producer and song-writer, and formerly an actor. He revitalized music culture post-revolution in Iran, Aghili was born in Tehran, Iran and later emigrated to Canada first, but currently resides in Los Angeles.

Biography

Career
Aghili started early in music and studied piano, guitar and violin, graduated from the Tehran Conservatory of Music.

He has worked at the IRIB (the official broadcasting of Iran) for a while. He released his cassette album Bahar e Man (My Spring) in 1997, an instrumental music album where he played piano, guitar and violin. The album Fasl e Ashenayi (Season of Acquaintance) in 1998, was another great effort with a number of collaborations. The follow up Mosafer (Traveler) was also well received by the public. Aghili appeared also on screen with the movie Par e Parvaz (Wings to Fly), a best-seller in Iran for that year. He also wrote the soundtrack for the film. He had also a lead role in Shab-e Berahne (The Naked Night).

Aghili immigrated to Canada where he was signed to Nova Media. His first album in Canada was Khiali Nist (I Don't Care), quickly followed by Doori o Pashimani (Separation and Regret), Adam Foroush (Traitor) and Popcorn.

He released Taghdir (Fate), a highly praised album on a new contract with Century Records, in 2009. And in 2012, Tarafdaar (On Your Side) was released on Avang Music.

Shadmehr Aghili is a versatile artist, violinist and musician. Beside of his prominent use of piano, guitar and violin, he also plays santur, mandolin, trumpet, harmonica, keyboard, banjo, and koto in some recordings. Shadmehr also remains active politically recording a track in 2010, conveying his support of the Iranian Green Movement recorded over background music, encouraging Iranian people to protest against their government and using music as a tool to get to freedom and liberty. And in 2012, in a collaboration with singer Ebi, he released the anti-war Roya ye Ma (Globally released A Dream) in support of World Vision USA and World Vision Canada.

Discography

Albums

Singles

Soundtrack 
 2000: Par-e Parvaz ("Wings to Fly") (Soundtracks of a film of the same name)

 2001: Shab-e Berahne ("The Naked Night") (Soundtracks of a film of the same name

See also
 Persian traditional music
 Music of Iran
 Persian pop music

References

External links

1973 births
Living people
Iranian pianists
Iranian composers
Iranian guitarists
People from Tehran
Iranian violinists
Iranian pop singers
Singers from Tehran
Iranian male singers
Musicians from Tehran
Iranian music arrangers
Persian-language singers
Iranian record producers
Iranian singer-songwriters
Iranian emigrants to Canada
Iranian expatriates in Canada
20th-century Iranian male singers